Annesijoa is a monotypic genus of plants in the family Euphorbiaceae. The sole species, Annesijoa novoguineensis is endemic to New Guinea.

Etymology
Annesijoa is a taxonomic anagram derived from the name of the confamilial genus Joannesia. The latter name is a taxonomic patronym honoring the king John VI of Portugal.

References

Jatropheae
Monotypic Euphorbiaceae genera
Endemic flora of New Guinea